Joseph E. Nyre is an American academic administrator, currently serving as the president of Seton Hall University. Prior to his appointment, Nyre served as the president of Iona College.

Early life and education 
Nyre is from Beloit, Wisconsin, and is a first-generation college graduate. Nyre attended the University of Missouri, University of Kansas and Harvard Medical School. In addition to his service in academic administration, Nyre has also worked as a clinical psychologist and academic at Baylor University, the University of Illinois at Chicago, and Harvard Medical School.

References

People from Beloit, Wisconsin
University of Missouri alumni
University of Kansas alumni
Harvard Medical School alumni
Heads of universities and colleges in the United States
Year of birth missing (living people)
Living people
Seton Hall University people